The German National Honor Society or Delta Phi Alpha , is the sole post-secondary national honorary society for German studies in the United States.  According to the organization, the honor society seeks to "recognize excellence in the study of German and to provide an incentive for higher scholarship. The society aims to promote the study of the German language, literature, and civilization, and endeavors to emphasize those aspects of German life and culture which are of universal value and which contribute to humankind's eternal search for peace and truth."  Delta Phi Alpha was founded on May 27, 1929 at Wofford College in Spartanburg, South Carolina, where the Alpha chapter still resides. The honor society is currently operated from the campus of Washington & Jefferson College in Washington, PA. The society has over three hundred constituent chapters at colleges and universities throughout the United States.

History

21 Wofford students under the guidance of the Dr. James A. Chiles met in Old Main in February 1928, and founded a German Club they named Deutscher Verein. Over the next year, John Olin Eidson '29 and members of the Wofford group began contacting German clubs at other schools. Invitations were sent to active German clubs in about twelve or fifteen small colleges to form chapters of a national fraternity. This led to the formation of Delta Phi Alpha, the National Honorary German Society, on May 27, 1929. Wofford was the Alpha chapter of the society, and Dr. Chiles became its president, a position he occupied for the remainder of his active career.

Chapters
The active chapters of Delta Phi Alpha:

Additionally the charters of Delta Phi Alpha as of 1939 include:

By the end of 1929: Alpha at Wofford College, Beta at Central College in Fayette, Missouri, and Gamma at Bates College in Lewiston
 1930: Vanderbilt University; Davidson College, North Carolina Berea College, Kentucky; University of Rochester; Birmingham-Southern College; University of Washington. 
 1931: Rutgers University; West Virginia University; Alabama College; Wittenberg College, Ohio; University of Cincinnati; Duke University; University of Illinois; University of Pennsylvania. 
 1932: University of South Carolina; New York University; Western Reserve University; Bucknell University; University of California a Los Angeles; Washington University in St. Louis.
 1933: Indiana University; Cornell University; Clark University.
 1934: University of Colorado; University of Buffalo; Southern Methodist University; University of Southern California; Union Col Schenectady, N. Y. 
 1935: Colgate University; Miami University, Oxford, Ohio. 
 1936: University of Oregon; University of Tennessee; Hunter College; University of Iowa. 
 1937: Drake University; Capital University, Columbus, Ohio; Baldwin-Wallace College, Berea, Ohio.

See also
National Honor Society
Spanish National Honor Society
French National Honor Society

References

External links
Delta Phi Alpha
 http://blogs.wofford.edu/from_the_archives/2009/02/10/james-a-chiles-teacher-and-scholar/

High school honor societies
Student organizations established in 1968
1968 establishments in Florida